Gocha Chikovani (born 12 October 1962) is a retired Georgian professional football player.

External links
 

1962 births
Living people
Soviet footballers
Footballers from Georgia (country)
Georgia (country) international footballers
FC Dinamo Tbilisi players
FC Dinamo Batumi players
Association football defenders